Lorenzo Lauria (born July 17, 1947 ) is an Italian international bridge player. He is a six-time world champion and a World Grand Master of the World Bridge Federation (WBF). As of July 2014 he ranks fifth among Open World Grand Masters and his regular partner Alfredo Versace ranks fourth.

Major bridge tournament wins

 Bermuda Bowl 2005, 2013
 European Team Championships:1979, 1995, 1997, 2001, 2002, 2004, 2006, 2010
 World Open Teams: 1998, 2002
 Grand Prix Open Teams : 1999
 World Team Olympiad: 2000, 2004
 European Champions' Cup for Open Teams: 2003, 2004, 2005, 2007, 2008, 2009
 World Mind Sports Games: Open Teams 2008 — successor to the quadrennial Olympiad
 North American Bridge Championships (12)
 Jacoby Open Swiss Teams (1) 2001 
 Vanderbilt (2) 1999, 2004 
 Mitchell Board-a-Match Teams (3) 2002, 2003, 2011 
 Reisinger (4) 2000, 2007, 2010, 2011 
 Spingold (3) 2001, 2002, 2015

Runners-up

 North American Bridge Championships
 Mitchell Board-a-Match Teams (1) 2001 
 Reisinger (3) 1998, 2001, 2005 
 Spingold (1) 2006

References

External links
 
 

Italian contract bridge players
Bermuda Bowl players
Living people
1947 births
Place of birth missing (living people)